Pavel Suchilin, (born 18 October 1985), is a Russian futsal player who plays for Dinamo Moscow and the Russian national futsal team.

References

External links
FIFA profile
UEFA profile
AMFR profile

1985 births
Living people
Russian men's futsal players